Daniel Coats (born April 16, 1984) is a former American football tight end. He was signed by the Cincinnati Bengals as an undrafted free agent in 2007. He played college football at Brigham Young University.

He has also played for the Denver Broncos.

Professional career

Cincinnati Bengals
Coats was re-signed by the Bengals as an exclusive-rights free agent on February 12, 2009. On October 26, 2010, he was waived by the Bengals after making six appearances in 2010.

Denver Broncos
On November 9, 2010, Coats was signed by the Denver Broncos. Coats was released by the Broncos just a day later, as the team decided to sign running back Lance Ball to the active roster. Coats was signed by the Broncos on December 6, 2010, filling one of the roster spots made available by the placing of tight end Dan Gronkowski and linebacker Joe Mays on injured reserve. Coats was released on July 31, 2011 by the Broncos.

New York Giants
Coats signed with the New York Giants on August 7, 2011. Coats was released during the team's final cuts.

References

External links
BYU Cougars bio
Cincinnati Bengals bio
Denver Broncos bio

1984 births
Living people
People from Layton, Utah
Players of American football from Utah
American football tight ends
BYU Cougars football players
Cincinnati Bengals players
Denver Broncos players
New York Giants players